Samuel "Samu" Casado Conde (born 16 January 1997) is a Spanish footballer who plays as a goalkeeper.

Club career
Born in Guadix, Granada, Andalusia, Casado joined Málaga CF's youth setup in June 2011, after representing UCD La Cañada Atlético, UD Almería and Guadix CF. He made his senior debut with the reserves on 13 March 2016, starting in a 3–0 Tercera División away defeat of Vélez CF.

Casado spent his first two seasons as a backup to Aarón Escandell, and renewed his contract until 2021 on 30 March 2017. He subsequently shared the first-choice status with Kellyan, and achieved promotion to Segunda División B in 2018.

On 28 August 2019, Casado signed a three-year deal with Segunda División side AD Alcorcón. He made his professional debut on 9 November, coming on as a second-half substitute for injured Dani Jiménez in a 1–1 away draw against UD Las Palmas.

On 17 July 2021, Casado agreed to a one-year contract with Real Valladolid Promesas, after cutting ties with Alkor.

References

External links
 
 
 

1997 births
Living people
Sportspeople from the Province of Granada
Spanish footballers
Footballers from Andalusia
Association football goalkeepers
Segunda División players
Segunda División B players
Tercera División players
Atlético Malagueño players
AD Alcorcón footballers
Real Valladolid Promesas players
People from Guadix